Li Hanjun (1890 – December 17, 1927) was an alternate member of the 3rd Central Executive Committee of the Chinese Communist Party. He was the younger brother of Li Shucheng. Born in Hubei Province, he studied abroad in Japan from 1902 to 1918, graduating from University of Tokyo. He was fluent in Japanese, English, French and German. Although a founding member of the Chinese Communist Party, he later left the party after coming into conflict with Zhang Guotao and joined the Kuomintang. An opponent of Chiang Kai-shek's anti-Communist campaign, he fled to the Japanese concession in Hankou when Chiang's supporters entered Wuhan in November 1927. He was captured by the New Guangxi clique and murdered.

1890 births
1927 deaths
Alternate members of the 3rd Central Executive Committee of the Chinese Communist Party
Chinese Communist Party politicians from Hubei
Chinese expatriates in Japan
Delegates to the 1st National Congress of the Chinese Communist Party
Executed people from Hubei
People executed by the Republic of China
Politicians from Qianjiang
Republic of China politicians from Hubei
University of Tokyo alumni
Wuhan University alumni